The 2012 Chattanooga Mocs football team represented the University of Tennessee at Chattanooga as a member of the Southern Conference (SoCon)in the 2012 NCAA Division I FCS football season. They were led by fourth-year head coach Russ Huesman and played their home games at Finley Stadium. They finished the season 6–5 overall and 5–3 in SoCon play to place in a three-way tie for fourth.

Schedule

References

Chattanooga
Chattanooga Mocs football seasons
Chattanooga Mocs football